Sober Island is a rural community on the Eastern Shore of Nova Scotia, Canada, in the Halifax Regional Municipality. The community is situated on Sober Island. Sober Island Pond is located in the middle of the island. It is connected to the mainland by Sober Island Road. There are no numbered highways on Sober Island.

References

External links
Explore HRM
Sober Island Destination Nova Scotia
Sober Island Brewing Co

Communities in Halifax, Nova Scotia
General Service Areas in Nova Scotia